The 2011–12 season was Blackpool F.C.s first season back in the Football League Championship, the second tier of English professional football, after being relegated from the Premier League at the conclusion of 2010–11 campaign. It was their 103rd overall season in the Football League. It was Ian Holloway's third season as manager.

The club finished the regular season in fifth position, thus qualifying them for the play-offs. They reached the final, in which they lost to West Ham 1–2.

Kevin Phillips, in his first season at Blackpool, finished as the club's top scorer with seventeen goals (sixteen in the League).

Season summary

Pre-season
Over the summer, the club released nine players. They were goalkeepers Paul Rachubka and Richard Kingson; defenders Rob Edwards, David Carney and Danny Coid; midfielders Malaury Martin (who did not make any appearances for the club), former club captain Jason Euell and Ishmel Demontagnac; and forward Marlon Harewood. In addition, on-loan defender Salaheddine Sbaï returned to Nîmes without appearing for the Seasiders, forward Sergei Kornilenko's loan move was also not made permanent, and midfielder Andy Reid decided to not to extend his short-term contract.

The first arrival at Bloomfield Road was midfielder Bojan Djordjic, who had played under Ian Holloway at Plymouth Argyle.

Two more departures occurred in early July. Midfielder Charlie Adam sealed his move to Kenny Dalglish's Liverpool for a £7-million fee. The Blackpool supporters' Player of the Year the previous term and Adam's midfield partner for the previous campaign, David Vaughan, also left after turning down a new contract. He signed for Sunderland on 7 July.

Also in early July, the club tied-up contract extensions with four players: goalkeeper Matthew Gilks and defenders Stephen Crainey, Ashley Eastham and Ian Evatt.

On 9 July, former Preston North End left back Matt Hill signed on a free transfer. He joined the club at their pre-season training camp in Portugal.

The following day, former England striker and European Golden Shoe winner Kevin Phillips joined, again on a free transfer.

On 18 July, the eve of Blackpool's first pre-season friendly against Rangers, the club signed 20-year-old Argentine midfielder Gerardo Bruna from Liverpool on a two-year contract.

Four days later, former Scotland international midfielder Barry Ferguson signed from Birmingham City, where he had been playing with Kevin Phillips, for £750,000, in a two-year deal with an option for a third. Fellow Scot, left-back Bob Harris, joined from Queen of the South. Another defender, Paul Bignot, became Ian Holloway's third signing in 24 hours when he joined from Newport County.

On 25 July, Spanish midfielder Ángel Martínez joined on a two-year contract, with an option for a third, from Espanyol. This gave Ian Holloway a squad of 31 going into Blackpool's final pre-season friendly against Hibernian the following day.

Prior to the evening kick-off against Hibs, Blackpool completed the signing of 22-year-old Scottish striker Craig Sutherland, who was playing in the US college leagues.

A tenth close-season signing occurred on 3 August, when Liverpool midfielder Tom Ince, son of former England captain Paul, put pen to paper to seal a two-year deal, with an option for a third year.

On the eve of the new season, D. J. Campbell sealed his drawn-out move to Q.P.R. for an undisclosed fee believed to be around £1.2 million. The same day, Spanish centre back Miguel Ángel Llera joined the club on a free transfer. He had been on trial with the Seasiders, and scored a free-kick in Blackpool's friendly defeat to Lancaster City three days earlier. The same day, Louis Almond joined Barrow on loan. This gave Ian Holloway a squad of 33 to choose from for the 5 August League visit to Hull City.

Season proper
Hull City hosted Ian Holloway's men in a Friday-night curtain-raiser for the 2011–12 Football League season. Six of the players that started against Manchester United in the club's final Premier League fixture 75 days earlier were featured in the starting line-up. They were Matt Gilks, Stephen Crainey, Ian Evatt, Alex Baptiste, Keith Southern and Gary Taylor-Fletcher. Meanwhile, starting debuts were given to Barry Ferguson and Kevin Phillips, while fellow new boy Craig Sutherland came on as a late substitute for Taylor-Fletcher. Matt Hill was an unused substitute. It was Taylor-Fletcher who scored the only goal of the game, on 81 minutes, to give Blackpool a perfect start to the campaign. The Tangerines topped the table for less than 24 hours, however: Ipswich Town replaced them the following day after their 3–0 victory at Bristol City.

Six days later, Blackpool travelled to Hillsborough to take on Sheffield Wednesday in the first round of the League Cup, with Ian Holloway naming a completely different starting eleven to that of the previous game. The tie finished goalless after both ninety minutes of normal time and thirty of extra. To a penalty shootout it went, and Wednesday, managed by former Seasiders boss Gary Megson, won 4–2.

It was back to League action on 14 August, and Blackpool hosted Peterborough United for the first home fixture of the campaign. Kevin Phillips opened the scoring one minute before half-time. He then doubled the Tangerines lead three minutes into the second half. Six minutes from time, the visitors' George Boyd pulled one back. With their victory, which maintained their 100% start to the League campaign, Blackpool moved up to third in the table. With his substitute appearance, Matt Phillips became the 26th player used by Ian Holloway in their three games.

The Seasiders then hosted Derby County in a midweek fixture at Bloomfield Road. The visitors, with a single goal, inflicted the hosts' first League defeat of the campaign. Blackpool slipped five places to eighth as a result.

On 19 August, Ian Holloway's men endured an eight-and-a-half-hour coach ride down to the south coast to face Brighton & Hove Albion the following day. Craig Mackail-Smith opened the scoring for the Seagulls just before the half-hour mark. The lead was doubled five minutes into the second half via Ashley Barnes. Kevin Phillips pulled one back for the Tangerines on the hour mark, before levelling matters in the 90th minute. It was Phillips' fourth goal in as many games for his new club. Blackpool remained eighth.

Eight days later, Blackpool again took to the road, this time Crystal Palace being the opposition. Alex Baptiste opened his goalscoring account for the season, with a 41st-minute strike. With eleven minutes remaining, Glenn Murray equalised for the Eagles. Blackpool climbed to seventh place with the result.

On 31 August, transfer-deadline day in England, Blackpool secured the services of two players. The first, in a permanent, one-year deal, was Maltese forward Daniel Bogdanović, from Sheffield United for £250,000. The other was West Bromwich Albion right-back James Hurst, on loan for the rest of the season. He was, however, recalled in October.

After an international break, Blackpool hosted Paul Jewell's Ipswich Town at Bloomfield Road on 10 September. After a goalless first half, Gary Taylor-Fletcher put the hosts ahead four minutes after the break. Barry Ferguson, with his first goal in English football for seven years, doubled Blackpool's lead on the hour mark, before leaving the game with a hamstring injury with fourteen minutes remaining. Blackpool climbed one place to seventh with their victory. With eleven points taken from a possible eighteen, it has been Blackpool's best start to a League season in twenty years.

Cardiff City were the visitors to Bloomfield Road a week later – the first meeting between the two clubs since Blackpool's victory in the play-off final sixteen months earlier. The visitors took the lead through Don Cowie four minutes into the second half. Kevin Phillips equalised for the Tangerines just after the hour mark – his fifth League goal in seven games. Blackpool remained seventh with the point gained.

On 24 September, Blackpool made the long trip to the south coast to face Portsmouth at Fratton Park. Matt Phillips was given a rare start by Ian Holloway, but the 20-year-old missed two golden chances in the first half. He was substituted in favour of Ludovic Sylvestre nine minutes after the restart. The game remained goalless until the fourth minute of added time, when Norwegian Erik Huseklepp netted the vital goal. Blackpool slipped one place to eighth with the defeat, which ended a four-game unbeaten streak.

Three days later, Coventry City were the opposition at the Ricoh Arena. Gary Taylor-Fletcher opened the scoring on eighteen minutes. Gary Deegan leveled for the hosts an hour later. Lukas Jutkiewicz put the Sky Blues ahead five minutes later, before Keith Southern equalised two minutes into stoppage time. Blackpool sat in tenth place with the result.

On 1 October, Blackpool marked their tenth League fixture with a 5–0 victory over Bristol City at Bloomfield Road. Gary Taylor-Fletcher, with his fourth goal of the season, put the Tangerines in front eight minutes before the break. Jonjo Shelvey, signed the previous day on loan from Liverpool, doubled the lead with a low thirty-yard free-kick. Daniel Bogdanovic opened his scoring account for Ian Holloway's men with the third, on 83 minutes. Two minutes into injury time, Brett Ormerod made it four. Bogdanovic scored his second and Blackpool's fifth in the 94th minute.

After a two-week break, Blackpool suffered a heavy defeat, 4–0, at the hands of West Ham United at Upton Park. They dropped to thirteenth place with the loss.

Three days later, they returned to winning ways, at home to Doncaster Rovers, courtesy of a stoppage-time winner from Tom Ince. It was his second of the game. He had levelled proceedings just after the hour mark with his first goal for the club. The three points lifted Blackpool to eighth.

Two successive defeats ensued — 1–2 at Nottingham Forest and 1–3 at Burnley — before a 5–0 whitewash of Leeds United at Elland Road on 2 November. It was former Seasiders manager Simon Grayson's first meeting with the club since he left them in 2006. Goalkeeper Paul Rachubka, who crossed the Pennines during the summer, was at fault for three of Blackpool's goals, and he was withdrawn at half time in favour of 18-year-old Alex Cairns. Blackpool climbed to eighth place with the victory.

Three days later, Blackpool hosted Millwall at Bloomfield Road in what was Ian Holloway's 100th league game in charge of the club. Kevin Phillips struck the only goal of the game on 61 minutes, just two minutes after coming on as a substitute for Keith Southern. It was Phillips' seventh goal of the campaign. Blackpool, who had taken six points and scored as many goals in four days, moved up to fifth. It was also their second-consecutive clean sheet.

Two 2–2 draws ensued — at Middlesbrough on 19 November, then the following week at home to Birmingham City. Ludovic Sylvestre and Jonjo Shelvey netted in the first fixture, while full-back duo Stephen Crainey and Neal Eardley scored the goals in the latter. Blackpool moved into the play-off places with the second of the two points.

A midweek trip to Leicester City resulted in a 2–0 defeat, meaning Ian Holloway had yet to beat his former club as a manager. Blackpool dropped two places to eighth with the result.

December was rung in with the visit of Reading to the seaside. The Seasiders on-loan forward Callum McManaman scored the only goal of the game ten minutes into the second half to give the hosts the three points, which moved them up one place to seventh.

The following week, Blackpool made the long trip to table-toppers Southampton. Former Tangerine Rickie Lambert opened the scoring on the half-hour mark. Chris Basham, making only his second League start of the season, brought the visitors level six minutes later with his first goal for Blackpool. Callum McManaman put Blackpool ahead four minutes into the second half with his second goal in as many games. Lambert equalised for Southampton three minutes into injury time, preserving their unbeaten home record for the campaign; however, the result ended their 21-match winning run at St Mary's. Blackpool slipped one place to eighth with the point.

Watford visited Bloomfield Road on 17 December for what turned out to be a goalless draw. Blackpool remained eighth.

On Boxing Day, Blackpool travelled to face Barnsley at Oakwell. Mark Howard made his debut in the Blackpool goal, replacing the injured Matt Gilks. The hosts' Matt Done opened the scoring on eighteen minutes. Just under twenty minutes later, Matt Phillips opened his scoring account for the season for Blackpool. On 67 minutes, Phillips put the visitors ahead, before completing his hat-trick from the penalty spot eight minutes from time. Blackpool climbed one place to seventh.

New Year's Eve saw a visit to Birmingham City, with Barry Ferguson facing the club he left in the summer. Ferguson was sent off ten minutes into the second half, with Blackpool 2–0 down. Nathan Redmond sealed the result in the final minute. Blackpool dropped to ninth with the defeat.

Blackpool rang in 2012 by welcoming Middlesbrough to the seaside. Matt Phillips opened the scoring five minutes after the break. Seven minutes later, Lomana LuaLua doubled the lead. A Seb Hines own goal on 70 minutes ended the scoring. Blackpool climbed back up to seventh with the three points.

On 7 January, Blackpool raised the curtain on their FA Cup campaign with a seven-mile trip to Fylde Coast neighbours Fleetwood Town, managed by former Seasiders midfielder Micky Mellon. Lomana LuaLua broke the deadlock on 24 minutes. Two minutes after the restart, Matt Phillips doubled Blackpool's lead. On 55 minutes, Tom Ince made it three. The Cod Army pulled a goal back through Jamie Vardy before Phillips (77' and 81') completed his second hat-trick in as many weeks (and in the process became the club's joint-top scorer with namesake Kevin Phillips) to put Blackpool through to the Fourth Round with a 5–1 scoreline.

Seven days later, Blackpool travelled to face Paul Jewell's Ipswich Town at Portman Road. The Tractor Boys went two goals up within an hour, through a Ángel Martínez own goal and a Tommy Smith header, before substitutes Elliot Grandin and Kevin Phillips rescued a point for the visitors, which dropped them two places to ninth.

On 21 January, Blackpool hosted Crystal Palace. Dougie Freedman's men took the lead via an Owen Garvan penalty just before the half-hour mark. The score remained the same until five minutes from the end of normal time, when substitute Elliot Grandin scored his second goal in as many games. Also for the second consecutive game, it was two substitutes who scored, this time Chris Basham, with his second of the campaign, with thirty seconds remaining, to give the Seasiders the three points. They moved up to seventh with the victory.

A week later, and Blackpool faced Sheffield Wednesday in a cup competition for the second time this season, this time the FA Cup Fourth Round at Bloomfield Road. Clinton Morrison put the Owls ahead seven minutes into the second half. Kevin Phillips sent the match to a replay with an injury-time penalty.

On 31 January, Blackpool repeated the feat of coming back from a goal down in the dying minutes, this time against bottom club Coventry City. Conor Thomas put the visitors ahead just inside the hour, but strikes from Kevin Phillips (87') and Gary Taylor-Fletcher (94') gave the Tangerines the three points, which lifted them two places to sixth, the final play-off position.

Into February, and Blackpool travelled to Wales to face third-placed Cardiff City. The Bluebirds took the lead just before the hour mark, via Joe Mason. Substitute Kevin Phillips levelled twenty minutes later, with his tenth League goal of the campaign, before a double from Matt Phillips sealed the victory for Blackpool. With the three points, their third consecutive victory, the Seasiders climbed three places to fourth — two points behind their hosts and eight behind leaders West Ham.

Blackpool coupled their third consecutive victory with a progression to the Fifth Round of the FA Cup after beating Sheffield Wednesday 3–0 at Hillsborough in their replay on 7 February. Matt Phillips opened the scoring on seven minutes, with his tenth goal of the season. Seven minutes later, Lomana LuaLua doubled their lead. Ludovic Sylvestre settled the tie on 54 minutes.

Back to League action on 11 February, and Blackpool hosted Portsmouth. Erik Huseklepp put Pompey ahead on the stroke of half-time. Fourteen minutes from time, Stephen Crainey levelled matters with a curling free-kick from just outside the penalty area. It was the first time he had scored two goals in one season. Blackpool slipped one place to fifth with the point.

Three days later, Blackpool made the midweek trip to Doncaster Rovers. Gary Taylor-Fletcher put the visitors two goals ahead with strikes on 20 minutes and 34 minutes. El Hadji Diouf pulled one back for Donny from the penalty spot two minutes before the break. Frenchman Nouha Dicko, on loan from Wigan Athletic, notched his first goal for Blackpool on 72 minutes, sealing the three points for Ian Holloway's men, which moved them back up to fourth.

A trip to Everton in the last sixteen of the FA Cup occurred on 18 February. It was the two clubs' first-ever meeting in the FA Cup. It was also Blackpool's furthest venture in the competition since the 1989–90 campaign, when they were knocked out by Q.P.R. The Seasiders exit was effectively sealed six minutes into the tie, at which point they were already two goals down. An unmarked Royston Drenthe put the Toffees ahead after 49 seconds. Denis Stracqualursi doubled their lead four minutes later, and that's how the score remained. A mostly second-string Blackpool — captained in Barry Ferguson's absence by Alex Baptiste — lost Gary Taylor-Fletcher to injury just twenty minutes in. Kevin Phillips missed an injury-time penalty for Blackpool.

On 21 February, former Blackpool manager Sam Allardyce returned to Bloomfield Road with West Ham, his fifth managerial role since leaving the seaside fifteen years earlier. James Tomkins put the Hammers ahead just before the half-hour mark. Four minutes later, their lead was doubled via Nicky Maynard's close-range strike. On the stroke of half-time, Kevin Phillips, who came on ten minutes earlier for the out-of-sorts Chris Basham, scored his eleventh League goal of the campaign. Eight minutes after the break, West Ham's goalkeeper Robert Green was sent off for a professional foul on Roman Bednář. Midfielder Henri Lansbury was put in goal, and proceeded to keep the ball out of his net for the remainder of the game. Indeed, West Ham stretched their lead on 74 minutes, through Gary O'Neil, and sealed the victory in the final minute through Ricardo Vaz Te. Blackpool slipped to seventh with the defeat, their first in the League in 2012.

Four days later, Blackpool travelled to Bristol City, arch-rivals of Ian Holloway's former club, Bristol Rovers. City took the lead through Jon Stead after 29 minutes. Tom Ince, in front of watching father Paul, levelled ten minutes into the second half. Ince then put the Seasiders ahead on 84 minutes, three minutes before Kevin Phillips notched his thirteenth goal in all competitions. With the victory, their sixth in nine League games, Blackpool moved up three places to fourth.

Into March, and on the second Blackpool hosted Hull City at Bloomfield Road, the reverse fixture to that which opened the campaign. Tom Ince put Blackpool in front on 27 minutes with a thirty-yard strike, ending the Tigers six-game run of clean sheets. A last-minute equaliser from Matty Fryatt prevented Blackpool from climbing into third, but they remained fourth.

Two successive away defeats ensued, at Derby County and Peterborough United, which saw Blackpool slip out of the play-off places into seventh.

They returned to winning ways on 17 March, with a 3–1 home victory over Brighton & Hove Albion. Joe Mattock put the Seagulls ahead after seven minutes. Ian Evatt levelled matters eight minutes before the break. Three minutes later, Kevin Phillips put Blackpool ahead. Ten minutes from time, Phillips doubled his tally and secured the three points for the hosts.

Kevin Phillips netted another brace in the midweek fixture with Leicester City, his second — scored in the fourth minute of injury time — earned Blackpool a point in a 3–3 draw. Roman Bednar, with his first goal for the club, scored Blackpool's second.

On 24 March, Blackpool travelled to Reading. They returned empty-handed after a 3–1 defeat. Lomana LuaLua scored Blackpool's goal.

Seven days later, Blackpool closed out March by hosting top-of-the-table Southampton. Ian Holloway rang the changes — seven in total — after their previous result. Recent loan signing, the returning Stephen Dobbie (who became the tenth Scot in the Blackpool squad), opened the scoring with a 22nd-minute penalty. He doubled the Seasiders lead nine minutes later with a route-one strike. Ian Evatt headed in a third on 52 minutes from Matt Phillips' corner to seal the three points. Blackpool climbed back into the play-off zone with the three points.

A Good Friday visit to Watford resulted in a second successive victory and clean sheet. Another Stephen Dobbie double, including another from the penalty spot, ended the Hornets seven-game unbeaten run and put Blackpool three points clear of sixth-placed Brighton, who lost at Burnley.

Three days later, a struggling Barnsley visited Bloomfield Road and held on for a draw after taking the lead two minutes into the second half. Matt Phillips leveled for the hosts on 71 minutes.

Another — this time goalless — draw followed, at Nottingham Forest, on 14 April.

Blackpool returned to winning ways on 17 April, with a single-goal result against Neil Warnock's Leeds United at Bloomfield Road. Ángel Martínez got the goal, his first in English football. He became Blackpool's 22nd different goalscorer of the season. The Tangerines remained fifth — two places inside the play-off zone — four points clear of seventh-placed Middlesbrough.

Four days later, Blackpool secured a play-offs appearance for the second time in three seasons, with a 4–0 defeat of local rivals Burnley. Stephen Dobbie, returning after a brief spell out through injury, opened the scoring, with his fifth goal in as many starts. Gary Taylor-Fletcher doubled the lead early in the second half, with his eighth League goal of the campaign. Stephen Crainey made it 3–0 just after the hour mark, before Nouha Dicko completed the scoring with ten minutes remaining. The victory was Blackpool's fourth in their last six outings, and their third-successive clean sheet. It lifted them two places to fourth.

On 28 April, the final day of the regular season, Blackpool drew 2–2 at Millwall. The Lions went ahead, but Ian Evatt levelled with a header just before the half-hour mark. Nouha Dicko scored his second goal in as many games to put the visitors ahead, but Millwall restored parity in the final minute. Blackpool finished in fifth place, with 75 points to their name.

Blackpool hosted Birmingham City in the first leg of their play-off semi-final on 4 May. A Tom Ince strike, a minute before the break, was deflected past his own 'keeper by Curtis Davies. It proved to be the only goal of the game. The victory was Blackpool's tenth successive in play-off fixtures, dating back to 2001, when they were in the basement division.

The second leg, played five days later at St. Andrew's, ended 2–2, which meant Blackpool progressed to the final 2–3 on aggregate.

Blackpool faced West Ham in the final at Wembley on 19 May. The Hammers took the lead through a first-half Carlton Cole strike. Tom Ince levelled the game three minutes into the second half, but the Londoners scored what proved to be the winner on 87 minutes, via the boot of Ricardo Vaz Te.

League table

Results

Pre-season

Championship

Play-offs

League Cup

FA Cup

Squad statistics

|}

Players used: 37
Goals scored: 92 (79 League; 4 play-offs; 9 FA Cup) (includes two own goals)

Transfers

Players in

Players out

Notes
 Entered competition in third round

References

Blackpool F.C. seasons
Blackpool